The University of Cassino and Southern Lazio is an Italian public research university located in Cassino, Italy. It was established in 1979.

Organization
The University of Cassino and Southern Lazio comprises faculties in the fields of economics, engineering, humanities (literature and philosophy), law and human movement sciences.

See also
 List of Italian universities
 Cassino, Italy

References

External links
 University of Cassino Website

Cassino
Cassino
Educational institutions established in 1979
1979 establishments in Italy